Protecting the Nation from Foreign Terrorist Entry into the United States is the title of two Executive orders issued by U.S. President Donald Trump:
 Executive Order 13769
 Executive Order 13780

See also 
 Trump travel ban